Matysová (Matysova) is a village and municipality in Stará Ľubovňa District in the Prešov Region of northern Slovakia.

History
In historical records the village was first mentioned in 1408.

Geography
The municipality lies at an altitude of 600 metres and covers an area of 10.430 km². It has a population of about 78 people.

External links
Matysová - The Carpathian Connection
https://web.archive.org/web/20080111223415/http://www.statistics.sk/mosmis/eng/run.html

Villages and municipalities in Stará Ľubovňa District
Šariš